The Wilnecote School (formerly Wilnecote High School) is a co-educational secondary school located in Wilnecote (near Tamworth) in the English county of Staffordshire.

Previously a foundation school administered by Staffordshire County Council, Wilnecote High School converted to academy status in September 2012 and became part of the Community Academy Trust in September 2016 changing its name to The Wilnecote School. The school continues to coordinate with Staffordshire County Council for admissions.

The Wilnecote School is also the location of Wilnecote Leisure Centre, a sports and leisure facility that is for the community outside of school hours.

Notable former pupils
 Jack Manuel, cricketer
 Stinson Hunter, filmmaker and online activist

References

External links
The Wilnecote School official website

Secondary schools in Staffordshire
Academies in Staffordshire